Lintzoain is a town located in Erroibar valley, in province and chartered community of Navarre, northern Spain.

The Way of St. James passes through it after Bizkarreta-Gerendiain and before Zubiri, in the neighbouring Esteribar valley.

References 

Towns in Spain